KSIW is a radio station airing a sports format licensed to Woodward, Oklahoma, broadcasting on 1450 kHz AM. The station is owned by Classic Communications, Inc.

Translators

References

External links
KSIW's website

Sports radio stations in the United States
SIW
CBS Sports Radio stations